West Hill Cemetery (also called Sherburne West Hill Cemetery) is a historic cemetery at Sherburne in Chenango County, New York. The cemetery contains over 4,500 burials, two thirds of which predate 1950.  The earliest burial dates to 1803.  The cemetery includes a small, one story brick chapel built in 1905.

Col. William Stephens Smith (1755–1816), US Representative and son-in-law of President John Adams is buried here.

The cemetery was added to the National Register of Historic Places in 2006.

References

External links
 
 

Cemeteries on the National Register of Historic Places in New York (state)
Cemeteries in Chenango County, New York
National Register of Historic Places in Chenango County, New York